is a Japanese novel series by Atsuko Asano that was published by Kadokawa Shoten. The series is about Harada Takumi and Gō Nagakura, two boys who start a baseball team. For the work the author received the Noma Prize for Juvenile Literature in 1997 and the Shogakukan Children's Publication Culture Award in 2005. It has sold over 10 million copies in Japan, and has been adapted into a film in 2007 and an anime television series in 2016.

Plot
This story is about a young baseball pitcher named Takumi Harada who just recently moved in with his grandfather, a former coach at Nitta High School. Later on, Harada meets a catcher named Gō Nakagura. They start playing ball together, and Harada realizes that Gō can keep up with his pitches. Harada gets motivated and joins the baseball team at Nitta High. The two boys later begin their journey with a baseball team.

Characters

Main characters

Portrayed by: Kento Hayashi (movie), Yūma Nakayama (TV drama)

Portrayed by: Kenta Yamada (movie), Shō Takada (live-action series)

Other characters

Portrayed by: Akihiro Yarita (movie), Shintarō Morimoto (TV drama)

Portrayed by: Dai Watanabe (movie), Ryūta Nakamura (TV drama)

Portrayed by: Yasuaki Seki (movie), Kazuma Kawahara (TV drama)

Portrayed by: Hiroshi Yazaki (movie), Ryōsuke Kawamura (TV drama)

Media

Anime
An anime television series adaptation aired on July 14, 2016 on the noitaminA block of Fuji TV and concluded on September 22, 2016. The series was directed and written by Tomomi Mochizuki, with animation by the studio Zero-G. Hideoki Kusama served as character designer and chief animation director, and Akira Senju was in charge of the music.

References

External links

Battery at Kadokawa Shoten 

1996 Japanese novels
Anime and manga based on light novels
Baseball in anime and manga
Baseball novels
Discotek Media
Japanese novels adapted into films
Kadokawa Dwango franchises
Kadokawa Shoten manga
Light novels
Noitamina
Novels by Atsuko Asano
Shōjo manga
Zero-G (studio)
Japanese baseball films